Goat Island (or Goat Islands) may refer to:

Arts
 Goat Island (performance group), a Chicago-based company
 Goat Island (play), Delitto all'isola delle capre, by Ugo Betti

Places

Australia
 Goat Island (Port Jackson) in Sydney Harbour
 Goat Island (Tasmania)
 Several islands within the Murray River in South Australia
Goat Island, within the Murray River National Park in the Riverland of South Australia

Canada
 Goat Island, one of the Little Bay Islands in Newfoundland and Labrador
 Goat Island (British Columbia)
 Goat Island (Ontario)

Ireland
 Goat Island (Ardmore) in County Waterford

Jamaica
 Great Goat Island in Saint Catherine Parish
 Little Goat Island in Saint Catherine Parish

Marshall Islands
 Goat Island in Wotje Atoll in the Marshall Islands

New Zealand
 Goat Island / Rakiriri, Otago Harbour, Dunedin, South Island
 Mahurangi Island (Goat Island), at the Coromandel Peninsula, North Island
 Mapoutahi, formerly known as Goat Island, a peninsula near Waitati in Otago, on the South Island's east coast
 Takangaroa Island, formerly known as Goat Island, part of the Mayne Islands in the western reaches of the Hauraki Gulf / Tīkapa Moana
 Goat Island (Auckland), North of Auckland, North Island

Trinidad and Tobago
 Goat Island (Trinidad and Tobago), a small island off the coast of Little Tobago

United Kingdom
 Goat Island (County Fermanagh), a townland in County Fermanagh, Northern Ireland

United States
 Goat Island (Solano County), in Suisun Bay, California
 Goat Island (Connecticut), in Wequetequock Cove
 Goat Island (Hawaii), also called Mokuʻauia
 Goat Island (Maine), see Goat Island Light
 Goat Island (Maryland), in the Chesapeake Bay, see list of islands of Maryland
 Goat Island (Mohawk River), in the Mohawk River in New York
 Goat Island (New York), in the middle of Niagara Falls
 Goat Island (Clackamas County, Oregon), in the Willamette River
 Goat Island (Columbia County, Oregon), in the Columbia River
 Goat Island (Curry County, Oregon), part of the Oregon Islands National Wildlife Refuge
 Goat Island (or Bird Island) in Harris Beach State Park, Oregon
 Goat Island (Rhode Island), in Newport Harbor, the former site of a U.S. naval torpedo station
 Goat Island (South Carolina), in the Murrells Inlet
 Goat Island (Mississippi), Iuka/Pickwick Lake
 Goat Island (Lake Wylie), in York County, South Carolina
 Goat Island, Texas (see list of islands of Texas):
 Goat Island (Brown County, Texas)
 Goat Island (Galveston County, Texas), north of the Bolivar Peninsula and damaged during the 2008 Atlantic hurricane season
 Goat Island (Stephens County, Texas), in Lake Daniel
 Goat Island (Tarrant County, Texas), in Lake Worth in Fort Worth, Texas
 Goat Island, the nickname for Aguigan, Northern Mariana Islands
 Goat Island, once the official name of Yerba Buena Island in the San Francisco Bay, California

American Samoa
 Goat Island, an area in Utulei

Vanuatu 
 Goat Island, name variant of Vete Manung (Île de la Chèvre)